Edward Farquharson Johnston (14 October 1854 - 24 June 1924) was a Scottish football executive and referee who was one of the founders of Spanish club Sevilla FC on 25 January 1890, serving as the club's first president of the club for 15 years, from 1890 to 1905. He was also the co-owner of the firm MacAndrews & Co. and the British vice-consul in Sevilla from 1879 to 1906. He was also president of the Pigeon-shooting Society.

Early history
Edward Farquharson Johnston was born in Newmill, Elgin, as the son of James Johnston and Margaret Miller Farquharson. He began his studies at Weston House, a prestigious educational center in his hometown, where he would come to meet Alexander Graham Bell. Later, he completed his academic training at the Mill Hill School, a famous English public school near London. Upon completing his education, Edward F. Johnston began his professional career by joining the shipping company of Robert MacAndrews & Co (based on London), with whom he was directly related through his maternal family. Robert's shipping company had commercial lines between Spain and the United Kingdom, and had extensive business connections in Spain and Asia Minor.

Life in Seville
After several years in the London office, Edward F. Johnston was sent to Seville as a representative of the MacAndrews shipping company in the early 1870s. The company had established an important trade line between Seville and Scotland through the port of Dundee, where they shipped tons of bitter oranges from Seville for the manufacture of their famous marmalade. For around 30 years he remained in charge of supervising the activities of the company, which he managed with remarkable success, significantly increasing already relevant operations.

In 1875, together with Welton and MacPherson (among others), he founded the Club de Regatas de Sevilla. The oldest account of a sporting activity made by him can be found in 1878 aboard the Macareno boat, forming part of its crew (together with Welton, Niño and White) in some regattas held on the Guadalquivir, next to Tablada, in honor of the Spanish royal family, who were visiting Seville. He was also president of the Pigeon-shooting Society.

On 23 January 1879, Edward Johnston was appointed British vice-council in Seville until his retirement on 5 October 1906. From the beginning, he became a prominent figure in the social and economic life of Seville. However, it was his role as founding president of Sevilla FC that had the most permanent impact on the city.

Sevilla FC
On 25 January 1890, a group of young residents of British origin in Seville met in a café and formed Sevilla FC. The club's founding document, published on 17 March 1890 by the Scottish newspaper Dundee Courier's, states that Sevilla FC was legally founded on 25 January 1890 by Mr. Johnston, thus being one of the oldest football clubs in Continental Europe and the oldest in Spain founded exclusively for the practice of football, since Recreativo de Huelva, founded a month and two days earlier, on 23 December 1889, did so as a recreational club. The 35-year-old Edward F. Johnston was elected the club's first-ever president, while another Scot, a native of Glasgow, Hugh McColl became the first captain. Among the agreements made by the club's founders on that historic evening, it was agreed to play the game in accordance with the rules of The Football Association. The MacAndrew shipping company, of which he was co-owner and director in Seville, was in charge of supplying sports equipment to the club, as well as a large number of players, such as William MacAndrews.

A few weeks after founding the club, its members wrote a letter to the Huelva recreational club to invite them to play a football match in Seville. Although the Huelva team had never played together, they decided to accept the invitation on 3 March, and the match was held five days later, on 8 March 1890 at the Hipódromo de Tablada, a horse racing track. This was the very first football match on national territory between two clubs, and Johnston was its referee in a 2–0 win for Seville, thus going down in history as the referee of the first football match in Spain constituted and under the rules of the FA.

Years later, in January 1909, the city of Seville mobilizes to help the victims of the bloody 1908 Messina earthquake, and organizes a tribute match to the victims of the tragedy, and like years ago, Johnston was the referee.

Personal life
In 1879 Johnston married Mary Crombie at Balgownie Lodge, Aberdeen. The couple had three children, all born in Seville. The first son, Gilbert, died in infancy. His second child, Edward John, was killed in the trenches in France during World War I. Johnston's third son, James, joined his father in the family business.

He died on 14 June 1924 at the age of 69 and was cremated at Golden's Green.

References

1854 births
1924 deaths
Scottish footballers
Scottish football referees
Spanish football referees
Spanish referees and umpires
Scottish expatriate sportspeople in Spain
Expatriate footballers in Spain
Scottish expatriate footballers